William Arthur Kinneberg (born July 4, 1957) is a former American baseball coach. He served as head baseball coach of the Utah Utes in 1996 and from 2005 to 2021. Coach Kinneberg lead the Utes to the university's first ever men's Pac-12 championship in the 2016 season, finishing with a 26–29 overall record.

Early life and education
Born in Sewell, Chile, Kinneberg grew up in Douglas and Morenci, Arizona and Silver City, New Mexico, where he graduated from Silver High School in 1975. 

Kinneberg began his college baseball career at the junior college level pitching for Central Arizona College from 1976 to 1977 and transferred to the University of Arizona to play for the Arizona Wildcats from 1978 to 1979 under Jerry Kindall. As a senior in 1979, Kinneberg had a 7–4 record and led Arizona to an appearance in the College World Series.

Kinneberg was a pitcher for the Arizona Wildcats, owning a 7–4 record with 7 saves over two seasons.  He appeared in the 1979 College World Series with the Wildcats.

Coaching career
After ending his playing career, Kinneberg was hired as an assistant at UTEP.  He served in that role for four seasons before assuming the head coaching role for the 1985 season.  In what was to be the last season of baseball at UTEP, Kinneberg led the Miners to a program record 33 wins.  After the end of UTEP's program, he moved to Wyoming, setting a program record for wins in Laramie in 1990 with a 37–18 record.  Kinneberg earned Western Athletic Conference Coach of the Year honors for the 1990 season, and coached 16 All-Conference players at Wyoming.  Ironically, the Cowboys program was shut down in 1996, just four years after Kinneberg's departure for Arizona State.  Kinneberg spent two seasons with the Sun Devils, helping to guide them to consecutive College World Series appearances.

Kinneberg spent one season as a pitching coach in the Chicago White Sox system, before returning to college head coaching at Utah for the 1996 season.  He led the Utes to a 30–22 season and a third-place finish in the WAC.  He then accepted an associate head coaching position at Arizona, helping the Wildcats to a Regional appearance during his five years in Tucson.

Utah again offered him their head coaching position 2005.  During his second stint with the Utes, Kinneberg led the team to their first-ever MWC title and first NCAA Tournament appearance since 1960, coached three high level Major League Baseball Draft picks, including Utah's first-ever first round pick (C. J. Cron), and now leads the Utes in their new home in the Pac-12 Conference.  Kinneberg was named Pac-12 Baseball Coach of the Year in 2016 after leading the Utes to their first-ever Pac-12 Conference title.

Kinneberg also has coached USA Baseball's National Team (collegiate), beginning as a pitching coach in 1999, and as head coach in 2007 and 2010.

Personal life
Kinneberg and his wife, Janet, have two sons, Joe and David.Joe currently plays baseball at Western Nebraska Community College (WNCC)

Head coaching record
The following is a table of Kinneberg's yearly records as an NCAA head baseball coach.

References

1957 births
Living people
Arizona Wildcats baseball players
UTEP Miners baseball coaches
Wyoming Cowboys baseball coaches
Arizona State Sun Devils baseball coaches
Arizona Wildcats baseball coaches
University of Texas at El Paso alumni 
Utah Utes baseball coaches
People from Sandy, Utah
People from Cachapoal Province
People from Douglas, Arizona
Central Arizona Vaqueros baseball players
People from Silver City, New Mexico
People from Morenci, Arizona
Baseball pitchers
Chilean emigrants to the United States